Santa Fe, also named La Fe, is the second largest town on Isla de la Juventud of Cuba.

Geography
The town is located 20 km south of Nueva Gerona, the island's seat and main town. It was the first settlement on the island, built around mineral springs. Santa fe is linked with Nueva Gerona with a 15 km-long expressway.

Personalities
Tomás Aldazabal (b. 1976), volleyball player

See also

List of cities in Cuba
Municipalities of Cuba
Autopista de la Isla de la Juventud

References

External links

 Santa Fe on guije.com
 Santa Fe on EcuRed

Populated places in Isla de la Juventud